A list of notable politicians of the German Centre Party:

A
 Konrad Adenauer
 Peter Altmeier
 Rudolf Amelunxen
 Karl Arnold

B
 Anton Becker
 Johannes Bell
 Theodor Bergmann
 Konrad Beyerle
 Lorenz Bock
 Eugen Bolz
 Franz Bracht
 Josef Braun 
 Heinrich Brauns
 Heinrich Brüning
 Wilhelm Busch

C
 Peter Cahensly

D
 Wilhelm Deist
 Friedrich Dessauer
 Hedwig Dransfeld

E
 Erich Emminger
 Matthias Erzberger

F
 Konstantin Fehrenbach
 Paul Franken 
 Josef Frenken

G
 Ernst Ludwig von Gerlach
 Hans Globke
 Johann Baptist Gradl
 Margarete Gröwel
 Theodor von Guérard

H
 Elisabeth Hattemer
 Clemens Heereman von Zuydwyck
 Fritz Hellwig
 Andreas Hermes
 Carl Herold
 Georg von Hertling
 Josef Hilgers 
 Werner Hilpert
 Hans Hoffmann
 Karl Holzamer

J
 Wilhelm Johnen 
 Joseph Joos

K
 Ludwig Kaas
 Jakob Kaiser
 Heinrich Kampschulte
 Rudolf Kanzler
 Wilhelm Emmanuel von Ketteler
 Johann Klein
 Heinrich Köhler
 Georg Ignaz Komp
 Heinrich Konen
 Heinrich Krone
 Bruno Kurowski

L
 Franz Langewand
 Heinrich Laufenberg
 Paul Lejeune-Jung
 Bernhard Letterhaus
 Bernhard Lichtenberg
 Ernst Maria Lieber
 Charles, 6th Prince of Löwenstein-Wertheim-Rosenberg
 Hubertus, Prince of Löwenstein-Wertheim-Freudenberg
 Heinrich Lübke
 Hans Lukaschek

M
 Paul Majunke
 Hermann von Mallinckrodt
 Wilhelm Marx
 Michael Graf von Matuschka
 Georg Meistermann
 Christoph Moufang
 Eduard Müller
 Erwin Müller 
 Gebhard Müller

N
 Hubert Ney

P
 Franz von Papen
 Heinrich Pickel
 Hermann Pünder

R
 August Reichensperger
 Peter Reichensperger
 Hermann Roeren
 Heinrich Roth 
 Joseph Roth

S
 Albert Sauer 
 Karl Friedrich von Savigny
 Karl Scharnagl
 Josef Schmitt 
 Joseph Schmitt
 Burghard Freiherr von Schorlemer-Alst
 Josef Schrage
 Hugo Schulz
 Adam Stegerwald
 Thomas Szczeponik

T
 Christine Teusch
 Gustav Trunk

W
 Friedrich Wilhelm Weber 
 Helene Weber
 Karl Weber
 Helene Wessel
 Ludwig Windthorst
 Josef Wirmer
 Joseph Wirth

Z
Elisabeth Zillken

Centre Party